William Woodruff Niles (May 24, 1832 - March 31, 1914) was the third bishop of the Episcopal Diocese of New Hampshire, United States, and served as such from 1870 until his death in 1914.

Early life and education
William Woodruff Niles was born in Hatley, Quebec, Canada, the son of Daniel Swift Niles and his wife Della (Woodruff) Niles. After studying at the Derby Academy in Derby, Vermont, he attended Trinity College from which he received an A.B. in 1857 and an A.M. in 1860. In 1861 he graduated from Berkeley Divinity School, which was then located in Middletown, Connecticut.

Career
William Woodruff Niles was ordained a deacon on May 22, 1861 at Holy Trinity Episcopal Church in Middletown and a priest on May 14, 1862 at St. Philip's Episcopal Church in Wiscasset, Maine. He had been deacon in charge of St. Philip's and became its rector when he was ordained a priest. In 1864 he returned to Trinity College to become professor of Latin. In 1868 he also became part-time rector of St. John's Episcopal Church in Warehouse Point, Connecticut. On September 21, 1870, he was consecrated bishop of New Hampshire at St. Paul's Episcopal Church in Concord, New Hampshire. In the 19th Century, it was not uncommon for an Episcopal bishop to serve at the same time as rector of a parish. Bishop Niles assumed the unpaid rectorship of St. Paul's Church in Concord and continued in both capacities until his death.  In 1879, under his leadership, members of the 1875 Episcopal General Convention founded the Holderness School in New Hampshire, where a living hall was named in his honor.

Marriage and family
Niles was married to Bertha Olmsted, the half-sister of landscape architect Frederick Law Olmsted, on June 5, 1862 in Hartford, Connecticut. They had six children.

Honors
Bishop Niles received honorary degrees from Trinity, Dartmouth College, Berkley Divinity School and Bishop's College in Sherbrooke, Quebec.

References

1832 births
1914 deaths
Episcopal bishops of New Hampshire
People from Concord, New Hampshire
Anglophone Quebec people
Trinity College (Connecticut) alumni
Trinity College (Connecticut) faculty
Berkeley Divinity School alumni
19th-century Anglican bishops in the United States